George Gore (1857–1933) was an American baseball player.

George Gore may also refer to:
 George Gore (electrochemist) (1826–1908), English chemist
 George Gore (judge) (1675–1753), Irish lawyer
 George O. Gore II (born 1982), American actor